North End railway station  was a short-lived timber-framed station opened in 1871 by the East and West Junction Railway on its route from Stratford-upon-Avon to Fenny Compton.

It was not well patronised and closed within two years. A further attempt to operate it the following year lasted until 1877. There are no known existing photographs of the station due to its short working life and unremarkable appearance.

Routes

References

Disused railway stations in Warwickshire
Former Stratford-upon-Avon and Midland Junction Railway stations
Railway stations in Great Britain opened in 1871
Railway stations in Great Britain closed in 1877